Tichelaar is a Dutch occupational surname meaning "tile / brick maker". Among variant forms are Tigchelaar, Tigelaar and Tiggelaar. People with this name include:

Tichelaar
Jacques Tichelaar (born 1953), Dutch politician
Paul Tichelaar (born 1982), Canadian athlete
 (1642–c.1714), Dutch barber false accuser of Cornelis and Johan de Witt
Tigchelaar
Seth Tigchelaar (born 1990), Neuroscientist
Eibert Tigchelaar (born 1959), Dutch biblical scholar and Dead Sea Scrolls expert
Jeff Tigchelaar (born 1976), American poet and author
Sippie Tigchelaar (born 1952), Dutch speed skater

See also
Royal Tichelaar Makkum, Dutch pottery company
Nicola Tiggeler (born 1960), German actress, singer, and dancer

References

Occupational surnames
Surnames of Dutch origin